Olinka Hardiman (born 16 January 1960) is a French model and actress. She is best known for her strong resemblance to actress Marilyn Monroe, whom Hardiman has occasionally portrayed in pornographic parodies. She is also known by other pseudonyms such as Marilyn Lamour, Marilyn Mitchell, and Olivia Link.

Biography 
Hardiman was one of the biggest stars of French pornographic films during the 1980s. Director Michel Lemoine featured her as the protagonist of over a dozen films, including Neiges brûlantes (1982), L'été les petites culottes s'envolent (1984), and Marilyn, mon amour (1985). In addition to her popularity in France, Hardiman has also starred in films shot in Germany, Sweden, Italy, and the United States of America.

Hardiman has appeared in some mainstream films such as I Love You (1986) by Marco Ferreri, and Delirio di sangue (1988) de Sergio Bergonzelli. She is also one of the actresses who portrayed Emmanuelle, the erotic heroine created by Emmanuelle Arsan, in Emmanuelle in Cannes (1980), an unofficial sequel directed by Jean-Marie Pallardy.

Filmography

References

External links
 
 

1960 births
Living people
French film actresses
20th-century French actresses